Pungert is a small settlement in the Municipality of Loški Potok in southern Slovenia. The area is part of the traditional region of Lower Carniola and is now included in the Southeast Slovenia Statistical Region.

References

External links
Pungert on Geopedia

Populated places in the Municipality of Loški Potok